Corona (Spanish for "Crown") is a city in Riverside County, California, United States. At the 2020 census, the city had a population of 157,136, up from 152,374 at the 2010 census. The cities of Norco and Riverside lie to the north and northeast, Chino Hills and Yorba Linda to the northwest, Anaheim to the west, Cleveland National Forest and the Santa Ana Mountains to the southwest, and unincorporated Riverside County along the rest of the city's borders.

Corona, located along the western edge of Southern California's Inland Empire region, is known as the "Circle City" due to Grand Boulevard's  circular layout. It is one of the most residential cities in the Inland Empire, but also has a large industrial portion on the northern half, being the headquarters of companies such as Fender Musical Instruments Corporation, Monster Beverage Corporation, and supercar manufacturer Saleen.

Etymology 

Corona is Spanish for crown or wreath. Originally called South Riverside, citizens wanted to distinguish their city from the larger city of Riverside to the north.  When it came time to incorporate the city a number of different names were considered, but the name Corona was chosen to play upon a unique feature of the city, the one-mile diameter drive that circled the center of the town.

History

Indigenous 

Prior to the late eighteenth century, the area was primarily inhabited by the Tongva and Payómkawichum, who lived in a series of villages throughout the area. What is now Corona stood at the southeastern extent of Tovaangar, or the Tongva world, and at the northern edge of Payómkawichum territory. 

The primary settlement in the area was the village of Paxauxa, which was established along the banks of the Temescal Creek at about where Corona is situated today. The settlement was shared by both the Tongva and Payómkawichum people. Cooperation and marriage between the two villages was common. High above the city of Corona, the village of Pamajam was also located in a small valley of the Santa Ana Mountains.

Colonial period 
The founding of Mission San Juan Capistrano in 1776 and Mission San Luis Rey in 1798 saw the introduction of Spanish soldiers and missionaries in the area. This resulted in villagers being brought to the mission to be baptized and as labor. 

Spanish influence increased in the area with the establishment of the San Antonio de Pala Asistencia in 1816. Two years following the construction of this mission outpost, the Temescal Valley's first European resident, Leandro Serrano, was given permission by the Spanish to use the area for cattle grazing. His first order was to kill the local bear and mountain lion population for the imported herds.

After the secularization of the Spanish missions by the First Mexican Republic in 1833, the land under influence by the missions in Alta California was gradually granted to large landowners as ranches. In 1848, Californio governor Pio Pico issued this land to Bernardo Yorba, which included present-day city of Corona.

Establishment
Corona was founded at the height of the Southern California citrus boom in 1886, and is situated at the upper end of the Santa Ana River Canyon, a significant pass through the Santa Ana Mountains. The town of Corona was once the "Lemon Capital of the World". A museum there presents the lemon's former role in the local economy. The city derived its name (and its nickname, "The Circle City") from the unique layout of its streets, with a standard grid enclosed by the circular Grand Boulevard,  in circumference. The street layout was designed by Hiram Clay Kellogg, a civil engineer from Anaheim who was an influential figure in the early development of Orange County.

Corona was established as a town by the South Riverside Land and Water Company. The company was incorporated in 1886; founding members included ex-Governor of Iowa Samuel Merrill, R.B. Taylor, George L. Joy, A.S. Garretson, and Adolph Rimpau. Originally a citrus growers' organization, it purchased the lands of Rancho La Sierra of Bernardo Yorba, and the Rancho Temescal grant and the colony of South Riverside was laid out. They also secured the water rights to Temescal Creek, its tributaries and Lee Lake. Dams and pipelines were built to carry the water to the colony. In 1889, the Temescal Water Company was incorporated, to supply water for the new colony. This company purchased all the water-bearing lands in the Temescal valley and began drilling artesian wells.

Originally located in San Bernardino County, the city was named "South Riverside" and received its post office in that name on either May 27 or August 11, 1887 with Charles H. Cornell as the town's first postmaster. In 1893, South Riverside became part of the new Riverside County. In 1896, the city was renamed "Corona" for its circular Grand Boulevard, where three international automobile races were held in 1913, 1914 and 1916.

20th century

The city of Corona has been popular among celebrities drawn to its upscale areas and relative privacy compared to Los Angeles. Lucille Ball and Desi Arnaz spent time at their ranch, located in north Corona, and played golf often at the Cresta Verde Golf Course in the northeastern section of the city. After their divorce, Mr. Arnaz continued to live in Corona.

In recent years Corona has been known as the "Gateway to the Inland Empire". Prior to the 1980s, the city was largely an agricultural community, dominated by citrus orchards, ranches, and dairy farms. High real estate prices in Los Angeles and Orange counties made the area's land desirable to developers and industrialists, and by the late 1990s Corona was considered a major suburb of Los Angeles.

Housing development in the city has been accelerated by access to the area via the SR 91, with many families leaving Orange County to larger, more affordable housing available in the city. The construction of the nearby SR 71 has linked Corona to the Pomona and San Gabriel valleys. Due to traffic caused by Corona's considerable growth, toll lanes have been built along the 91 freeway, with future toll lane expansions under construction and in the planning stages along Interstate 15. While there were talks to construct a proposed  automobile and rail tunnel under Santiago Peak to connect Interstate 15 in Corona with Interstate 5 and SR 55 in Orange County to reduce commuter traffic on the crowded 91 freeway, this concept has been shelved indefinitely.

21st century
In 2002, the city government considered an initiative to secede from Riverside County and form an autonomous Corona County because the city government and some residents were dissatisfied with how services were handled in nearby areas. The effort was also considered by areas in other cities in the western part of the county as far south as Murrieta. Whether nearby cities such as Norco would have been included in the new county are unknown. The proposed county would have been bordered by San Bernardino County to the northwest and by Orange County to the west, but it never came to fruition.

Geography and climate

Corona is located in western Riverside County, east of Orange County.

Corona experiences a warm Mediterranean climate (Köppen climate classification: CSa) and has mild to cool winters and hot summers. Most of the rainfall (as in all of Southern California) occurs during winter and early spring.

Winter days are pleasant, with the average highs staying in the mid to upper 60s. But compared to other areas in Southern California, winter lows are colder, with common frost and chilly mornings. Snowfall within city limits is rare. Snow flurries will occasionally fall, usually once every other year, but it very rarely snows to the point where it accumulates. The nearby Santa Ana Mountains receive a dusting of snow a few times each winter.

Spring brings pleasant weather with daytime temperatures in the mid to upper 70s, and nighttime lows in the upper 40s. Spring showers are common during the beginning of the season but are a rarity by late May.

Summertime is hot, with highs averaging in the low to mid 90s. During the hottest months, daytime temperatures in Corona can exceed . In early summer, Corona receives common overcast weather known as "May Gray" and "June Gloom". Summer thunderstorms are sporadic and usually happen between July and September from the North American Monsoons, bringing increased humidity and scattered thunderstorms.

Autumn features warm days and sharply cooler evenings, but can be windy due to the Santa Ana winds, blowing in two or three times a year from October to December.

Economy
Businesses with global, national or major regional headquarters in Corona include:
 TCL, a Chinese technology company
 Monster Beverage, a worldwide manufacturer of soft drinks, including Hansen's beverages and the Monster Energy drink line.
 Circle K, an international convenience store chain.
 Saleen, manufacturer of specialty, high-performance sports cars.
 Fender, world-famous manufacturer of electric guitars, amplifiers, and musical equipment. The Fender Custom Shop is also based in the same building.
 Zumiez, youth and action sports clothing and accessory retailer. Corona is home to the Zumiez distribution center.
 Lucas Oil Products, manufacturer of automotive additive products and owner of naming rights to Lucas Oil Stadium, home venue of the Indianapolis Colts of the NFL. 
 Premium automotive television channel MAVTV, which Lucas Oil owns, is also based in Corona.
 Troy Lee Designs, makers of various motocross and mountain bike accessories and apparel.
 LuLaRoe, controversial and legally embattled multi-level marketing distributor of women's apparel.
 Sterno, manufacturers of portable cooking fuel.

Top employers
According to the city's 2022 Comprehensive Annual Financial Report, the top employers in the city are:

Demographics

2010

The 2010 United States Census reported that Corona had a population of 152,374. The racial makeup of Corona was 90,925 (59.7%) White (40.1% Non-Hispanic White), 8,934 (5.9%) African American, 1,153 (0.8%) Native American, 16,205 (10.6%) Asian, 552 (0.4%) Pacific Islander, 28,003 (18.4%) from other races, and 7,759 (5.1%) from two or more races. Hispanic or Latino of any race were 66,447 persons (41.9%); 33.7% of Corona's population are Mexican-American, 2.1% Puerto Rican, 1.2% Cuban, 1.2% Salvadoran, 1.1% Guatemalan, 0.5% Colombian, 0.5% Peruvian, 0.5% Argentine, 0.3% Honduran, 0.2% Nicaraguan, and 0.2% Ecuadorian. Among Asian-Americans, 2.3% of Corona's population were Filipino, 2.1% Vietnamese, 1.7% Korean, 1.4% Indian-Americans, 1.1% Chinese, 0.7% Japanese, 0.4% Pakistani, 0.2% Thai, and 0.1% Bangladeshi. The second largest group of Corona's population is made up of White Americans; the largest groups were 11.1% German-American, 6.7% Irish, 6.2% English, 4.0% Italian, 2.7% French, 1.6% Polish, 1.3% Dutch, 1.2% Norwegian, 1.1% Scottish, 1.1% Swedish. Middle Eastern/North African (MENA) people made up 2.5% of the population.

The Census reported that 151,863 people (99.7% of the population) lived in households, 229 (0.2%) lived in non-institutionalized group quarters, and 282 (0.2%) were institutionalized.

There were 44,950 households, out of which 22,735 (50.6%) had children under the age of 18 living in them, 27,357 (60.9%) were opposite-sex married couples living together, 5,971 (13.3%) had a female householder with no husband present, 3,004 (6.7%) had a male householder with no wife present. There were 2,690 (6.0%) unmarried opposite-sex partnerships, and 360 (0.8%) same-sex married couples or partnerships. 6,455 households (14.4%) were made up of individuals, and 2,224 (4.9%) had someone living alone who was 65 years of age or older. The average household size was 3.38. There were 36,332 families (80.8% of all households); the average family size was 3.72.

The population was spread out, with 45,674 people (30.0%) under the age of 18, 15,504 people (10.2%) aged 18 to 24, 44,215 people (29.0%) aged 25 to 44, 35,801 people (23.5%) aged 45 to 64, and 11,180 people (7.3%) who were 65 years of age or older. The median age was 32.5 years. For every 100 females, there were 97.0 males. For every 100 females age 18 and over, there were 94.5 males.

The homeowner vacancy rate was 2.3%; the rental vacancy rate was 5.3%. 103,170 people (67.7% of the population) lived in owner-occupied housing units and 48,693 people (32.0%) lived in rental housing units.

During 2009–2013, Corona had a median household income of $77,123, with 10.8% of the population living below the federal poverty line.

2000
As of the census of 2000, there were 124,996 people, 37,839 households, and 30,384 families residing in the city. The racial makeup of the city was 75.0% White, 6.4% Black or African American, 0.9% Native American, 7.5% Asian, 0.3% Pacific Islander, 17.5% from other races, and 5.3% from two or more races. 25.5% of the population were Hispanic or Latino of any race.

There were 37,839 households, out of which 49.6% had children under the age of 18 living with them, 63.8% were married couples living together, 11.2% had a female householder with no husband present, and 19.7% were non-families. 14.4% of all households were made up of individuals, and 3.8% had someone living alone who was 65 years of age or older. The average household size was 3.3 and the average family size was 3.6.

In the city, the population was spread out, with 33.4% under the age of 18, 8.9% from 18 to 24, 35.1% from 25 to 44, 16.8% from 45 to 64, and 5.8% who were 65 years of age or older. The median age was 30 years. For every 100 females, there were 98.0 males. For every 100 females age 18 and over, there were 95.6 males.

The median income for a household in the city was $98,615, and the median income for a family was $83,505 (these figures had risen to $88,620 and $95,450 respectively as of a 2007 estimate). Males had a median income of $44,752 versus $31,884 for females. The per capita income for the city was $21,001.  About 6.0% of families and 8.3% of the population were below the poverty line, including 10.1% of those under age 18 and 7.3% of those age 65 or over.

Government
Federal:
In the United States Senate, California is represented by Democrats Dianne Feinstein and Alex Padilla.

State:

Local:
In the Riverside County Board of Supervisors, Corona is in the Second District, represented by Karen Spiegel.

Infrastructure

Transportation
The city's downtown area is circled by Grand Boulevard, which is unique for being perfectly circular.

The city is served by the Corona (SR 71), Interstate 15 (I-15), and Riverside (SR 91) freeways.

There is a proposal to erect a new four-lane freeway along or near Cajalco Road to connect Interstates 15 and 215, although the plan remains controversial. In addition, there is a possibility of constructing a  tunnel under the Santiago Peak Mountains to the Eastern Transportation Corridor of the FastTrak toll-road company system in Orange, due to increased commuter traffic on State Route 91, which needs to be reduced by another freeway between Orange and Riverside counties.

Corona Municipal Airport (FAA designator: AJO) serves the city and has a  runway. On January 20, 2008, two small passenger aircraft collided over Corona, killing all four men aboard the planes and another man on the ground. In the past ten years, there have been five fatal plane crashes around Corona.

Public transportation

The city is linked with the 91 Line and Inland Empire–Orange County Line of the Metrolink commuter rail system, providing service to Los Angeles, Perris, San Bernardino, and Oceanside from the North Main Corona Metrolink Station in the Downtown area and the West Corona Metrolink Station in Corona's west side.

The City of Corona operates its own transportation system called the Corona Cruiser. It consists of two circular routes around the city.

Corona's public transportation also includes the following bus lines: RTA route 1 from West Corona to UC Riverside, RTA route 3 from Corona Regional Medical Center to Swan Lake in nearby Eastvale, RTA route 214 from Downtown Corona to The Village shopping center in Orange, RTA route 206 from Downtown Corona to Temecula, OCTA bus route from Anaheim to South Corona Walmart (Ontario Avenue), and the Corona Cruiser blue and red lines.

Healthcare

Corona is served by the following three hospitals:

 The Corona Regional Medical Center, a General Acute Care Hospital with Basic Emergency Services as of 2005
 Kaiser Permanente Corona  (no emergency services)
 Corona Regional Rehabilitation Hospital

Education
The city of Corona is a part of the Corona-Norco Unified School District and the Alvord Unified School District. Corona-Norco serves the majority of the city while Alvord serves a small section of eastern Corona.

There are five high schools in Corona: Corona, Centennial, Lee V. Pollard, Orange Grove, Santiago.

There are five middle schools in Corona: Auburndale, Citrus Hills, Corona Fundamental, El Cerrito, Raney.

There are also 28 elementary schools in the city:  John Adams, Susan B. Anthony, Cesar Chavez, Corona Ranch, Coronita, Dwight Eisenhower, Foothill, Ben Franklin, Garretson, Home Gardens, Jefferson, Lincoln Alternative, William McKinley, Orange, Parkridge, Prado View, Promenade, Riverview, Ronald Reagan, Sierra Vista, Stallings, Temescal Valley, Dr. Bernice Todd, Vandermolen, Vicentia, Victress Bower, George Washington and Woodrow Wilson.

Private schools include St. Edward Catholic School and Crossroads Christian School.

Nonprofit associations
The World Mosquito Control Association (WMCA) is located in Corona.

Utilities
Southern California Edison provides most of the city's electricity and a small part of the city is serviced by Corona Department of Water and Power. Waste Management Inc. provides waste disposal for the city. Southern California Gas Company provides natural gas services.

Cemetery
The Corona Sunnyslope Cemetery is a for-profit cemetery established in 1892. Notable burials include USC Trojans athletic director Jess Hill.

Corrections
California Institution for Women of the California Department of Corrections and Rehabilitation has a "Corona, CA" mailing address, but is in the City of Chino.

Neighborhoods

Center City

Downtown District 
Centered around Grand Boulevard Historic District (GBHD), Downtown District is the oldest area of the city by far, and encompasses portions of the neighborhoods of Civic Center and Circle City along with the entirety of GBHD.

North Main Street District 
The area north of Grand Boulevard Circle centered around N Main St, named North Main Street District, underwent drastic rebranding, redevelopment, and repair beginning in 2017, particularly on the west side of N Main St. Metro at Main - a large mixed-use development featuring apartments atop retail with additional retail along the property - is a commuter community due to its close proximity to Metrolink's Corona - North Main Station, and both SR 91 and I-15 freeways. The east side of N Main St - particularly E Harrison St and E Blaine ST between N Main St and N Joy St - will be converted to a mixed-use community featuring apartments and retail, further making use of the close proximity to Corona - North Main Station.

Historic South Main Street Palms District 
Beginning at the intersection of S Main St and Olive St - one block south of the Grand Boulevard Circle - Historic South Main Street Palms District is a long stretch of varying species of palms that were planted and integrated into the landscaping plan for South Corona in the early 20th century. It includes all of the houses and businesses along S Main St between Olive St and Chase Dr.

Eastside

Westside

Arts and culture

Performing arts
The Arts Alive Council is a non-profit organization created with the purpose to "foster, promote, and increase the public knowledge and appreciation of the arts and cultural activities in the greater Corona Area." Members include   the Corona Symphony Orchestra, Circle City Chorale, Christian Arts and Theater, and Corona Dance Academy.

Off Broadway Corona Theater (OBCTheater) is a non-profit organization. They produce two to three theatrical productions each year that are presented at the Corona Civic Center Auditorium.

Notable people

Athletes
 Mike Caffey - Point Guard for Crailsheim Merlins of the Basketball Bundesliga.
 Erica Blasberg (1984–2010) – LPGA golfer
 Vontaze Burfict – football linebacker
 Mike Darr – Major League Baseball outfielder
 Richard Dornbush – figure skater
 Heath Farwell – football linebacker
 Troy Glaus – former baseball player Los Angeles Angels
 Matt Kalil – football offensive lineman who is currently a free agent
 Ryan Kalil – football offensive lineman for the New York Jets
 Joe Kelly – MLB starting pitcher
 Denny Lemaster (born 1939) – MLB pitcher
 Jason Martin (born 1995) – MLB outfielder
 Taylor Martinez – former quarterback for Nebraska Cornhuskers
 Taryne Mowatt – All-American softball pitcher for Arizona Wildcats and two-time ESPY Award winner
 Ricky Nolasco – Major League Baseball pitcher for Los Angeles Angels
 Lonie Paxton – former NFL player for New England Patriots and Denver Broncos
 Chance Sisco – baseball player for Baltimore Orioles
 D. J. Strawberry – professional basketball player
Brice Turang – baseball player for Milwaukee Brewers
 Marcus Alan Williams – football safety for the New Orleans Saints
Ethan Zubak – soccer player for Nashville SC

Entertainers
 Travis Barker (born 1975) – drummer for Blink-182, Boxcar Racer, The Transplants, and +44
 Larissa "Bootz" Hodge – reality television participant, Flavor of Love 2, Flavor of Love Girls: Charm School
 Tyler Hoechlin – actor known for his role as Derek Hale in Teen Wolf and Superman/Clark Kent in Superman & Lois
 Candy Johnson – dancer and singer in 1960s AIP "beach" movies
 Kerry King (born 1964) – guitarist for Slayer
 Nikki Leonti – singer-songwriter, actress
 Crystal Lewis – Christian music singer, TV actress
 Michael Parks – actor, Kill Bill, Red State, The Happening and other films
 Asia Monet Ray – dancer, recording artist, former Dance Moms cast member
 Jenni Rivera – vocalist, songwriter of banda music
 Jodie Sweetin – actress known for her role as Stephanie Tanner on television sitcoms Full House and Fuller House
Lil Xan – rapper
Olivia Sanabia – actress, singer

Other
 Ken Calvert – United States Representative
 Cirilo Flores – Roman Catholic bishop
 Alex Harvill (1992–2021) – motorcycle stunt performer
 Shawn Ray – former professional bodybuilder and author
 Gary Webb – investigative journalist

Sister cities
The following are Corona's sister cities as designated by Sister Cities International.
  Fuxin, Liaoning, China
  Gōtsu, Shimane, Japan
  Ocotlán, Jalisco, Mexico
  Silkeborg, Denmark

See also

 Freeway Complex Fire – a 2008 wildfire that started at the Yorba Linda/Corona city limit line.
 Rancho Temescal (Serrano)
 List of U.S. cities with large Hispanic populations

References

External links

 

1896 establishments in California
Cities in Riverside County, California
Elsinore Trough
Incorporated cities and towns in California
Populated places established in 1886
Populated places established in 1896
Populated places on the Santa Ana River